Edward Baldwin Curtis (born 13 March 1933 in Newburyport, Massachusetts) is an American mathematician.

Life and career 

Edward Curtis received his bachelor's degree from Harvard University in 1954. After graduate study from 1958 to 1959 at the University of Oxford, he returned to Harvard and  earned a Ph.D. there in 1962. His thesis The Lower Central Series for Free Group Complexes was supervised by Raoul Bott. Curtis became an instructor at the Massachusetts Institute of Technology (1962–1964), assistant professor (1964–1967), and associate professor (1967–1970). In 1970 he became a professor at the University of Washington in Seattle, where he remained until his retirement as professor emeritus.

His research interests include graph theory and flow networks. In 1967 for his studies on algebraic topology he received a Guggenheim Fellowship and in 1972 the Leroy P. Steele Prize for his paper Simplicial homotopy theory.

Works 
 
 
 with James A. Morrow:

Sources 
 Mary Ellis Woodring and Susan Park Norton (eds.): Reports of the President and the Treasurer [of the John Simon Guggenheim Memorial Foundation] 1967 and 1968. New York 1967, p. 27 (excerpt)

References

External links 
 
 Edward B. Curtis at the math faculty website of the University of Washington (with photograph)
 Website of Edward B. Curtis at the U. of Washington
 Photograph of Edward Baldwin Curtis in MIT Museum
 Publications by Edward B. Curtis at the website of the AMS

20th-century American mathematicians
21st-century American mathematicians
Harvard University alumni
Massachusetts Institute of Technology School of Science faculty
University of Washington faculty
1933 births
Living people
People from Newburyport, Massachusetts
Alumni of the University of Oxford
Mathematicians from Massachusetts